The  is Nagoya's oldest  (traditional restaurant), located in Marunouchi 2-chome, Naka-ku, Nagoya.

History 
Founded during the Edo period (1603–1867), the  became a successful business that was patronised by the Owari Tokugawa rulers. In the Meiji period (1867–1911), successive politicians such as Ito Hirobumi also visited.

The  was established as a company in October 1912. It was heavily damaged during the bombing of Nagoya in World War II, and was rebuilt after the end of the war. 

The  served as host for a dinner in November 2019 for the foreign ministers of the G20 Aichi-Nagoya Foreign Ministers' Meeting. 

The  specialises in serving .

Buildings 
In 2005, the main building, front gate, wall,  gate, corridor, and kitchen were registered by the authorities as Registered Tangible Cultural Properties.

The  room was designed by Yoshirō Taniguchi in 1973. 

The  garden was created by the 10th generation Matsuo-ryu  Matsuo Sogo (Fusensai).

See also 
 Nagoya Kanko Hotel

References

External links 

 Homepage

Culture in Nagoya
History of Nagoya
Naka-ku, Nagoya